The 1996 Mount Union Purple Raiders football team was an American football team that represented the University of Mount Union in the Ohio Athletic Conference (OAC) during the 1996 NCAA Division III football season. In their 11th year under head coach Larry Kehres, the Purple Raiders compiled a perfect 14–0 record, won the OAC championship, and outscored opponents by a total of 669 to 184. They qualified for the NCAA Division III playoffs and advanced to the national championship team where they defeated , 56–24.

Junior quarterback Bill Borchert completed 250 of 374 passes (66%) for 4,035 yards and 55 touchdowns, including 505 yards and seven touchdowns in the Amos Alonzo Stagg Bowl. He was selected by the American Football Coaches Association as the first-team quarterback on its Division III All-America team and won the Melberger Award as the outstanding player in Division III.

Mount Union's 1996 season was the start of a record 54-game winning streak that spanned four seasons, continuing through December 6, 1998.

The team played its home games at Mount Union Stadium in Alliance, Ohio.

Schedule

References

Mount Union
Mount Union Purple Raiders football seasons
NCAA Division III Football Champions
College football undefeated seasons
Mount Union Purple Raiders football